Grammar Public School Rawalpindi is one of the leading schools in Rawalpindi. It was founded by Abu Muhammad Rizvi.

The school is now working under the Administration Of Sir Shamim Haider. The school is English medium Private school. The school provide Education up to the Matriculation level. Co-education is given up to Primary level.

Branches 
There are four branches of this school in Rawalpindi.
 Boys Branch (main branch)
 Girls Branch
 Arts Branch (chittian hattian)
 Primary branch

External links
Students of Grammar Public School excel in SSC

Universities and colleges in Rawalpindi District